Love Rain is a 2012 South Korean television series directed by Yoon Seok-ho. Set in the seventies and the present day, it tells a love story over two generations, with Jang Keun-suk and Im Yoon-ah playing dual roles. It aired on KBS2 from March 26 to May 29, 2012, on Mondays and Tuesdays at 21:55 for 20 episodes.

Despite low viewership ratings in Korea, it was popular overseas and was the most expensive Korean drama presold to Japan in 2012.

Synopsis
It's love at first sight when Seo In-ha (Jang Keun-suk) and Kim Yoon-hee (Im Yoon-ah) meet as shy university students in the seventies. It takes time for the hesitant pair to finally voice their feelings, but circumstances beyond their control send them down different paths. In 2012, In-ha (Jung Jin-young) is now unhappily married to Baek Hye-jung, one of Yoon-hee's former best friends. He has never gotten over his first love, and when he runs into Yoon-hee (Lee Mi-sook) after so many years, the two reconcile and look forward to making up for lost time.

In-ha's son Seo Joon (Jang Keun-suk) is a photographer, and he bumps into Yoon-hee's daughter Jung Ha-na (Im Yoon-ah) by chance. Unlike her mother, Ha-na is a cheerful and vivacious girl, and though they initially find each other troublesome, even as they argue, they can't help but be drawn to each other. In search of house, she rented place at Seo Joon and started sharing their day-to-day activities together. Gradually their feelings develop, and Joon and Ha-na fall in love.

Unaware that their children are dating each other, Seo In-ha (Jung Jin-young) and Kim Yoon-hee (Lee Mi-sook) announce that they are getting married, which will make Joon and Ha-na step-siblings. As both couples deal with the shock, Joon and Ha-na struggle with sacrificing their love for their parents' long-aborted happiness. But when their parents get to know about their love they risked their relationship for their children and breakup. After some time Yoon-hee goes overseas for her eye operation with her daughter taking care of her while she and pursued her gardening career there. After some days of caring her mother she left her mother with In-ha's care, so they can again purse their relationship there without any hurdle. Seo Joon and Jung Ha-na get married with blessing of Seo Joon's mother.

Cast
1970s 
Im Yoon-ah as Kim Yoon-hee 
Jang Keun-suk as Seo In-ha 
Kim Si-hoo as Lee Dong-wook
Son Eun-seo as Baek Hye-jung
Seo In-guk as Kim Chang-mo  
Hwang Bo-ra as Hwang In-sook

2012 
Im Yoon-ah as Jung Ha-na (Yoon-hee's daughter)
Jang Keun-suk as Seo Joon (In-ha's son)
Kim Si-hoo as Lee Sun-ho (Dong-wook's son)
Jung Jin-young as Seo In-ha
Lee Mi-sook as Kim Yoon-hee
Kim Young-kwang as Han Tae-sung
Oh Seung-yoon as Jo-soo
Park Se-young as Lee Mi-ho (Dong-wook's daughter)
Lee Chan-ho as Jang-soo
Shin Ji-ho as In-sung
Kwon In-ha as Lee Dong-wook
Yoo Hye-ri as Baek Hye-jung
Park Ji-il as Kim Chang-mo
Seo In-guk as Kim Jeon-seol (Chang-mo's nephew)

Production
Love Rain reunited director Yoon Seok-ho and screenwriter Oh Soo-yeon; they previously worked together on Autumn in My Heart and Winter Sonata a decade before.

Jung Jin-young and Jang Keun-suk were costars in the films The Happy Life (2007) and The Case of Itaewon Homicide (2009). Im Yoon-ah and Yoo Hye-ri were costars in the television series You are My Destiny (2008) and Cinderella Man (2009).

Love Rain began filming on September 24, 2011. The first day's shooting for the '70s' era took place at Keimyung University in Daegu, South Korea.

The drama was featured at the MIPTV, an international event for marketing and purchasing entertainment content held in Cannes, France in April 2012.

Soundtrack

Love Rain also featured non-Korean background music, such as "Verden Vil Bedras" by Sigvart Dagsland in episode 6, and "(Where Do I Begin?) Love Story" instrumentals in episodes 1 and 3.
Also the song "Vem vet" by Swedish singer and songwriter Lisa Ekdahl is used several times during the series.

Reception
Love Rain received low ratings domestically, with an average of 5.1% nationwide.

But due to the Korean Wave appeal of its lead stars Jang and Im, of all the Korean dramas sold abroad for 2012, Love Rain went for the highest price to Japan before it was even broadcast in Korea.

Ratings

Awards and nominations

Plagiarism lawsuit
Egg Film, the production company behind the 2003 film The Classic filed an injunction at Seoul District Court against Yoon's Color for copyright infringement on June 6, 2012. In it, the motion sought to ban any future broadcast of Love Rain and any subsequent production and sales of the drama and its related products. Egg Film claimed that the TV series' plot and characters were too similar to the film, specifically the themes of a couple breaking up because one chose friendship over love, and years later their children falling in love with one another.

Yoon's Color disputed the claims, stating that the themes were common to the melodrama genre, since several scenes of The Classic were also similar to Yoon Seok-ho's earlier TV dramas. They accused Egg Film of "trying to jump on the bandwagon" given the overseas success of Love Rain.

Film
Love Rain was re-edited into a two-part film which screened in Japanese theaters. The first part, composed mainly of scenes set in the 1970s, was released on September 20, 2013, while the second part, which focuses on the present day, was released on October 11, 2013. The film later aired on cable channel WOWOW in August 2014.

References

External links
  
 
 
 

2012 South Korean television series debuts
2012 South Korean television series endings
Korean Broadcasting System television dramas
Korean-language television shows
Television shows involved in plagiarism controversies
South Korean romance television series
South Korean melodrama television series